Silvia Bañón (born 21 October 1992) is a Spanish professional golfer and member of the Ladies European Tour (LET). She won the 2014 Portuguese Ladies Amateur and finished runner-up in the 2018 New South Wales Women's Open.

Amateur career
In 2012, Bañón won the Campeonato de Alicante and was runner-up at the German Ladies Amateur, behind Celine Boutier. In 2014, she won the Portuguese Ladies Amateur and finished third at the 2014 World University Golf Championship in Crans-Montana, Switzerland, behind Tiffany Chan and Marta Sanz. She won the Campeonato de Espana Universitario de Golf in 2015 and 2016.

Professional career
Bañón turned professional in 2016 and started playing on the LET Access Series. In 2017, she was third in the Belfius Ladies Open and the Ribeira Sacra Patrimonio de la Humanidad International Ladies Open, and finished 10th on the LETAS Order of Merit.

In 2018, Bañón was runner-up in the New South Wales Women's Open at Coffs Harbour Golf Club, two strokes behind Meghan MacLaren, and finished 26th in the LET Order of Merit. She made her major debut in the 2018 Women's British Open at Royal Lytham & St Annes Golf Club where she did not make the cut. In 2019, she was consistent and made 14 cuts in 16 LET starts.

Bañón sustained an injury to her arm and only made three appearances in 2020 but delivered one top-10, a 9th at the VP Bank Swiss Ladies Open.

Amateur wins
2012 Campeonato de Alicante
2013 Grand Prix des Landes
2014 Portuguese Ladies Amateur
2015 Campeonato de Espana Universitario de Golf
2016 Campeonato de Espana Universitario de Golf

Source:

Professional wins (2)

Santander Golf Tour wins (2)
2017: Santander Golf Tour Barcelona 
2019: Santander Golf Tour Sevilla (with Noemí Jiménez)

Source:

Results in LPGA majors
Results not in chronological order.

CUT = missed the half-way cut
NT = No tournament

Team appearances
Professional
European Championships (representing Spain): 2018

References

External links

Spanish female golfers
Ladies European Tour golfers
Sportspeople from Alicante
1992 births
Living people
20th-century Spanish women
21st-century Spanish women